Carnesecchi is a surname. Notable people with the surname include:

Dante Carnesecchi (1892–1921), Italian individualist anarchist
Marco Carnesecchi (born 2000), Italian footballer
Pietro Carnesecchi (1508–1567), Italian humanist

Italian-language surnames